Labo National High School (Labo NHS or LNHS) is a secondary school located at Brgy. Labo, Ozamiz, Philippines. Labo has only 2 educational institution along with Labo Central School. Most of the students are coming from its barangay and nearby like Cabunga-an, Embargo, Molicay, Kinangay, Gata, Gutokan, Sangay, Capucao, Carangan, and Bacolod Mentering.

External links
 Official Facebook Page

Education in Ozamiz
Schools in Misamis Occidental
High schools in the Philippines